In Major League Baseball, players have scored six or more runs in one game 16 times.  This record has been achieved by 15 players, the most recent being Joe Randa of the Kansas City Royals on September 9, 2004.  Mel Ott is the only player to accomplish the feat twice, doing so nearly a decade apart.

Three players — Ott, Cap Anson, and King Kelly — have been elected to the Baseball Hall of Fame.  A player's team has never lost a game in which he scored six runs.  None of the players who have scored six runs are currently active in MLB.

Guy Hecker scored seven runs for the Louisville Colonels against the Baltimore Orioles in the American Association on August 15, 1886, setting the record for professional baseball.  Hecker is also the only pitcher to score as many as six runs in a game.  In addition, Hecker collected six hits, another unique accomplishment for a pitcher.

Shawn Green's six run game set the Major League record for total bases (19) and tied the Major League records for home runs (4) and extra-base hits (5).

Five players on this list also collected six hits on their way to scoring six runs: King Kelly, Ginger Beaumont, Edgardo Alfonzo, Shawn Green and Joe Randa.

The record for runs in a postseason game is five.

Key

Players

Sources:

See also
 List of Major League Baseball runs records

References

Major League Baseball lists
Major League Baseball records